Rubén W. Cavallotti (Montevideo, 1924 - Buenos Aires, 1999) was a Uruguayan-born film director from Argentina.

Filmography
 Cinco gallinas y el cielo - 1957
 Prisoner 1040 (Procesado 1040) - 1958
 Gringalet - 1959
 Luna Park - 1960
 Don Frutos Gómez - 1961
 The Romance of a Gaucho (El romance de un gaucho) - 1961
 El Bruto - 1962
 Mujeres perdidas - 1964
 Bettina - 1964
 Viaje de una noche de verano - 1965
 Convención de vagabundos - 1965
 La Gorda - 1966
 Una Máscara para Ana - 1966
 Flor de piolas - 1969
 Vampire's Dream (Um Sonho de Vampiros) - 1969
 Subí que te llevo - 1980
 Mire qué lindo es mi país - 1981

References

External links
 

1924 births
1999 deaths
Argentine film directors
People from Montevideo
Uruguayan emigrants to Argentina
Uruguayan people of Italian descent